The Ireland Wolfhounds (also known as Ireland A and Ireland B) are the second national rugby union team of Ireland, behind the Ireland national team. They previously competed in the Churchill Cup together with the England Saxons, the national teams of Canada and the United States, as well as a selection of other nations' 1st, 2nd and 3rd representative sides (including Scotland A and the New Zealand Maori). They also played against other Six Nations countries' A sides during the Six Nations. They have intermittently played touring sides, namely South Africa in 2000, the All Blacks in 2001 and Australia in 2006. On the 21 June 2009, Ireland A won their first Churchill Cup, beating the England Saxons 49–22 in the final. They also won the Churchill Plate three times in 2006, 2007 and 2008. Initially named Ireland B, the side was redesignated to Ireland A from the 1992–1993 season. They were once again renamed the Ireland Wolfhounds in January 2010.  This name was inspired by a nomadic invitational side, which competed between 1956 and 1987 against other club sides throughout Ireland. The Wolfhounds have not competed in a competition since the IRFU declined to compete in the 2016 Tbilisi Cup. Ireland A played their first match in over seven years against the All Blacks XV in November 2022 at the RDS losing 19–47.

Squad
The Ireland Wolfhounds 23-man match day squad which was selected to play All Blacks XV on 4 November 2022 included:

Results

Home sides are listed first.

1940s
26 January 1946: Ireland XV 3–4 France, Lansdowne Stadium, Dublin
6 February 1946: England XV 14–6 Ireland XV, Twickenham Stadium, London
9 February 1946: Ireland XV 4–3 England XV, Lansdowne Stadium, Dublin
23 February 1946: Scotland XV 9–0 Ireland XV, Murrayfield, Edinburgh
9 March 1946: Wales XV 6–4 Ireland XV, Arms Park, Cardiff

1970s
6 December 1975: Ireland B 9–9 France B, Lansdowne Road, Dublin
4 December 1976: France B 16–3 Ireland B, Dijon
4 December 1976: Scotland B 3–7 Ireland B, Murrayfield, Edinburgh
1 December 1979: Ireland B 13–20 Scotland B, Lansdowne Road, Dublin

1980s
6 December 1980: England B 20–15 Ireland B, Twickenham Stadium, London
4 December 1982: Ireland B 6–10 England B, Ravenhill Stadium, Belfast
3 December 1983: Scotland B 22–13 Ireland B, Murrayfield, Edinburgh
1 December 1984: Ireland B 23–20 Scotland B, Galway Sportsground, Galway
2 September 1989: Canada 21–24 Ireland XV, Centennial Stadium, Victoria, British Columbia
9 September 1989: United States 7–32 Ireland XV, Downing Stadium, New York
9 December 1989: Scotland B 22–22 Ireland B, Murrayfield, Edinburgh

1990s
20 October 1990: Ireland B 27–12 Argentina, Thomond Park, Limerick
22 December 1990: Ireland B 16–0 Scotland B, Ravenhill Stadium, Belfast
1 March 1991: Ireland B 24–10 England B, Donnybrook Stadium, Dublin
28 December 1991: Scotland B 19–29 Ireland B, Murrayfield, Edinburgh
31 January 1992: England B 47–15 Ireland B, Richmond
28 December 1992: Ireland A 13―22 Scotland A, Lansdowne Stadium, Dublin
5 March 1993: Wales A 32―29 Ireland A, Newport
19 March 1993: Ireland A 18―22 England A, Donnybrook Stadium, Dublin
28 December 1993: Scotland A 24―9 Ireland A, Ayr
4 February 1994: Ireland A 10―20 Wales A, Donnybrook Stadium, Dublin
18 February 1994: England A 29―10 Ireland A, Richmond
20 January 1995: Ireland A 20―21 England A, Donnybrook Stadium 
3 February 1995: Scotland A 24―18 Ireland A, Myreside Stadium, Edinburgh
17 March 1995: Ireland A 19―30 Wales A, Pontypridd
19 January 1996: Ireland A 26―19 Scotland A, Donnybrook Stadium, Dublin
1 March 1996: Ireland A 25―11 Wales A, Donnybrook Stadium, Dublin
15 March 1996: England A 56―26 Ireland A, Richmond
12 November 1996: Ireland A 28―25 South Africa A, Donnybrook Stadium, Dublin
17 January 1997: Ireland A 23―44 France A, Donnybrook Stadium, Dublin
31 January 1997: Emerging Wales 34―14 Ireland A, Pontypridd
14 February 1997: Ireland A 30―44 England A, Donnybrook Stadium
28 February 1997: Scotland A 33―34 Ireland A, Myreside Stadium, Edinburgh
22 May 1997: Northland 69―16 Ireland A, Whangarei
26 May 1997: New Zealand Academy 74―15 Ireland A, North Harbour Stadium, Albany
29 May 1997: Bay of Plenty 52―39 Ireland A, Rotorua International Stadium, Rotorua
1 June 1997: Thames Valley 12―38 Ireland A, Paeroa
6 June 1997: King Country 32―26 Ireland A, Owen Delany Park, Taupo
10 June 1997: New Zealand Māori 41―10 Ireland A, Oval Grounds, Palmerston North
14 June 1997: Samoa 57―25 Ireland A, Apia Park, Apia, Att. 12,000
26 November 1997: Ireland A 26―10 Canada, Ravenhill Stadium, Belfast
6 February 1998: Ireland A 9―11 Scotland A, Donnybrook Stadium, Dublin
6 March 1998: France A 30―30 Ireland A, Quimper
20 March 1998: Ireland A 27―42 Wales A, Thomond Park, Limerick, Att. 7,000
3 April 1998: England A 40―30 Ireland A, Richmond
1 December 1998: Ireland A 19―50 South Africa, Ravenhill Stadium, Belfast, Att. 10,000
5 February 1999: Ireland A 26―25 France A, Donnybrook Stadium, Dublin
19 February 1999: Wales A 40―29 Ireland A, Ebbw Vale
5 March 1999: Ireland A 21―28 England A, Donnybrook Stadium, Dublin
19 March 1999: Scotland A 31―21 Ireland A, Myreside Stadium, Edinburgh
9 April 1999: Ireland A 73―17 Italy A, Donnybrook Stadium, Dublin

2000s
4 February 2000: England A 30―31 Ireland A, Franklin Gardens, Northampton
18 February 2000: Ireland A 23―21 Scotland A, Donnybrook Stadium, Dublin
3 March 2000: Ireland A 31―3 Italy A, Donnybrook Stadium, Dublin
18 March 2000: France A 31–25 Ireland A, Stade Marcel-Michelin, Clermont-Ferrand
31 March 2000: Ireland A 28―26 Wales A, Donnybrook Stadium, Dublin
15 November 2000: Ireland A 28–11 South Africa XV, Thomond Park, Limerick
2 February 2001: Italy A 16–68 Ireland A, Viterbo
16 February 2001: Ireland A 23–55 France A, Ravenhill, Belfast
8 November 2001: Ireland A 23–18 Samoa, Donnybrook, Dublin
13 November 2001: Ireland A 30–43 New Zealand XV, Ravenhill, Belfast
2 February 2002: Ireland A 55–22 Wales A, Musgrave Park, Cork
15 February 2002: England A 18–25 Ireland A, Franklin Gardens, Northampton
1 March 2002: Ireland A 60–3 Scotland A, Ravenhill, Belfast
22 March 2002: Ireland A 59–5 Italy A, Donnybrook Stadium, Dublin
5 April 2002: France A 30–20 Ireland A, La Roche-sur-Yon
15 February 2003: Scotland A 22–22 Ireland A, Bridgehaugh
21 February 2003: Italy A 11–28 Ireland A
7 March 2003: Ireland A 19–29 France A, Ravenhill, Belfast
28 March 2003: Ireland A 24–21 England A, Donnybrook, Dublin, Att. 6,000
11 March 2005: Ireland A 15–9 France A, Donnybrook, Dublin
10 February 2006: France A 20―12 Ireland A, Limoges
17 March 2006: England A 18–33 Ireland A, Kingsholm Stadium, Gloucester
3 June 2006: United States 13–28 Ireland A, Buck Shaw Stadium, Santa Clara, Att. 3,700
10 June 2006: New Zealand Māori 27–6 Ireland A, Buck Shaw Stadium, Santa Clara
17 June 2006: Ireland A 30―27 England Saxons, Commonwealth Stadium, Edmonton
15 November 2006: Ireland A 17–24 Australia A, Thomond Park, Limerick, Att. 6,500
9 February 2007: Ireland A 5–32 England Saxons, Ravenhill Stadium, Belfast, Att. 3,528
19 May 2007: Ireland A 39–20 Canada, Sandy Park, Exeter
29 May 2007: New Zealand Māori 50―22 Ireland A, Sandy Park, Exeter, Att. 4,679
2 June 2007: Ireland A 22–21 Scotland A, Twickenham, London
1 February 2008: England Saxons 31–13 Ireland A, Welford Road Stadium, Leicester
22 February 2008: Scotland A 67–7 Ireland A, McDiarmid Park, Perth
11 June 2008: Ireland A 46―9 United States, Richardson Memorial Stadium, Kingston
14 June 2008: Ireland A 12–34 England Saxons, Fletcher's Field, Markham
21 June 2008: Argentina A 8―33 Ireland A, Toyota Park
6 February 2009: Ireland A P―P England Saxons, Donnybrook Stadium, Dublin, Att. 1,500
13 February 2009: Ireland A 35―10 Scotland A, RDS Arena, Dublin
10 June 2009:  Ireland A 30–19 Canada, Infinity Park, Glendale
14 June 2009: Ireland A 40―5 Georgia, Infinity Park, Glendale
21 June 2009: England Saxons 22―49 Ireland A, Dick's Sporting Goods Park, Denver
13 November 2009: Ireland A 48–19 Tonga XV, Ravenhill Stadium, Belfast, Att. 3,777
27 November 2009: Ireland A 31–0 Argentina Jaguars, Tallaght Stadium, Tallaght, Att. 4,016

2010s
31 January 2010: England Saxons 17–13 Ireland A, Recreation Ground, Bath
5 February 2010: Ireland Wolfhounds 34–19 Scotland A, Ravenhill, Belfast, Att. 2,746
28 January 2011: Scotland A 32–12 Ireland Wolfhounds, Netherdale
4 February 2011: Ireland Wolfhounds 20–11 England Saxons, Ravenhill, Belfast, Att. 2,000
28 January 2012: England Saxons 23–17 Ireland Wolfhounds, Sandy Park, Exeter
16 November 2012: Ireland XV 53–0 Fiji, Thomond Park, Limerick, Att. 17,126
25 January 2013: Ireland Wolfhounds 10–14 England Saxons, Galway Sportsground, Galway
25 January 2014: England Saxons 8–14 Ireland Wolfhounds, Kingsholm Stadium, Gloucester
30 January 2015: Ireland Wolfhounds 9–18 England Saxons, Musgrave Park, Cork, Att. 8,200

2020s
4 November 2022: Ireland A 19–47 All Blacks XV, RDS Arena, Dublin

Home record

Above is the Ireland Wolfhound's home record in each stadium. Up to date as of 4 November 2022.

Statistics

Overall

The above is a list of the Ireland Wolfhounds' head-to-head record against international first and second sides, non-national representative sides such as the New Zealand Maori, as well as some club sides. Up to date as of 4 November 2022

Honours
Six Nations A Championship 
Winners: 1 (2002)
Six Nations A Triple Crown 
Winners: 2 (2000, 2002)
Churchill Cup
Winners: 1 (2009)
Churchill Plate
Winners: 3 (2006, 2007, 2008)
Melrose Sevens
Winners: 1 (1991)

See also
Ireland national rugby union team
Emerging Ireland
Ireland national under-20 rugby union team
Ireland national schoolboy rugby union team

References

External links
Results & Fixtures - Ireland Wolfhounds

Ireland Wolfhounds
Wolfhounds
Second national rugby union teams